Lauren Taylor may refer to:
Lauren Taylor (actress) (born 1998), American actress and singer
Lauren Taylor (golfer) (born 1994), English golfer
Lauren Taylor (fighter) (born 1983), American mixed martial artist
Lauren Taylor (journalist), English broadcast journalist
Lauren-Marie Taylor (born 1961), American film and television actress

See also
Laurie Taylor (disambiguation)